The men's 10,000 metres event at the 2011 All-Africa Games was held on 12 September.

Results

References
Results
Results

10000